Wyck may refer to:

WYCK, a Pennsylvanian AM broadcasting radio station
Wyck, Hampshire, a village in England
Wyck House, a historic house in Philadelphia, Pennsylvania
Wyck (Maastricht), a neighbourhood in Maastricht, Netherlands

See also
 Wick (disambiguation)